Ali Hosseini Khamenei (born 19 April 1939) is a Twelver Shia marja' and the second and current supreme leader of Iran, in office since 1989. Previously he served as the third president of Iran from 1981 to 1989. Khamenei is the longest serving head of state in the Middle East, as well as the second-longest serving Iranian leader of the last century, after Shah Mohammad Reza Pahlavi.

According to his official website, Khamenei was arrested six times before being sent into exile for three years during Mohammad Reza Pahlavi's reign. After the Iranian revolution overthrowing the shah, he was the target of an attempted assassination in June 1981 that paralysed his right arm. Khamenei was one of Iran's leaders during the Iran–Iraq War in the 1980s, and developed close ties with the now powerful Revolutionary Guards which he controls, and whose commanders are elected and dismissed by him. The Revolutionary Guards have been deployed to suppress opposition to him. Khamenei served as the third President of Iran from 1981 to 1989, while becoming a close ally of the first Supreme Leader, Ruhollah Khomeini. Shortly before his death, Khomeini had a disagreement with the heir he had chosen — Hussein Ali Montazeri — so there was no agreed on successor when Khomeini died. The Assembly of Experts elected Khamenei as the next Supreme Leader on 4 June 1989, at age 50. According to Akbar Hashemi Rafsanjani, Khamenei was the man Khomeini had chosen as his successor before dying.  Khamenei has been head of the servants of Astan Quds Razavi since 14 April 1979.

As Supreme Leader, Khamenei is the most powerful political authority in the Islamic Republic.  He is the head of state of Iran, the commander-in-chief of its armed forces, and can issue decrees and make the final decisions on the main policies of the government in many fields such as economy, the environment, foreign policy, and national planning in Iran. As Supreme Leader, Khamenei has either direct or indirect control over the executive, legislative and judicial branches of government, as well as the military and media, according to Karim Sadjadpour. All candidates for the Assembly of Experts, the Presidency and the Majlis (Parliament) are vetted by the Guardian Council, whose members are selected directly or indirectly by the Supreme Leader of Iran. There have also been instances when the Guardian Council reversed its ban on particular people after being ordered to do so by Khamenei.

There have been major protests during Khamenei's reign, including the 1994 Qazvin protests, the 1999 student protests, the 2009 presidential election protests, the 2011–2012 protests, the 2017–18 protests, the 2018–19 general strikes and protests, the 2019–20 protests, the 2021–22 protests, and the ongoing Mahsa Amini protests. Journalists, bloggers and other individuals have been put on trial in Iran for the charge of insulting Supreme Leader Khamenei, often in conjunction with blasphemy charges. Their sentences have included lashing and jail time; some of them have died in custody. Regarding the nuclear program of Iran, Khamenei issued a fatwa in 2003 forbidding the production, stockpiling and use of all kinds of weapons of mass destruction.

Early life and education 

Born to Seyyed Javad Khamenei, an Alim and Mujtahid born in Najaf, and Khadijeh Mirdamadi (daughter of Hashem Mirdamadi) in Mashhad, Khamenei is the second of eight children. Two of his brothers are also clerics; his younger brother, Hadi Khamenei, is a newspaper editor and cleric. His elder sister Fatemeh Hosseini Khamenei died in 2015, aged 89. His father was an ethnic Azerbaijani from Khamaneh, while his mother was an ethnic Persian from Yazd. Some of his ancestors are from Tafresh in today's Markazi Province and migrated from their original home in Tafresh to Khamaneh near Tabriz. Khamenei's great ancestor was Sayyid Hossein Tafreshi, a descendant of the Aftasi Sayyids, whose lineage supposedly reached to Sultan ul-Ulama Ahmad, known as Sultan Sayyid, a grandchild of Shia fourth Imam, Ali ibn Husayn.

Education 
Khamenei's education began at the age of four, by learning Quran at Maktab; he spent his basic and advanced levels of seminary studies at the hawza of Mashhad, under mentors such as Sheikh Hashem Qazvini and Ayatollah Milani. Then, he went to Najaf in 1957, but soon returned to Mashhad due to his father's unwillingness to let him stay there. In 1958, he settled in Qom where he attended the classes of Seyyed Hossein Borujerdi and Ruhollah Khomeini. Like many other politically active clerics at the time, Khamenei was far more involved with politics than religious scholarship.

Political life and presidency 

Khamenei was a key figure in the Iranian Revolution in Iran and a close confidant of Ruhollah Khomeini.

Since the founding of the Islamic Republic, Khamenei has held many government posts.

Muhammad Sahimi claims that his political career began after the Iranian Revolution, when the former President of Iran, Akbar Hashemi Rafsanjani, then a confidant of Khomeini, brought Khamenei into Khomeini's inner circle. Later on, Hassan Rouhani, then a member of Parliament, arranged for Khamenei to get his first major post in the provisional revolutionary government as deputy defense minister.

Khomeini appointed Khamenei to the post of Tehran's Friday prayers Imam in 1980, after resignation of Hussein-Ali Montazeri from the post. He served briefly as the vice Minister of National Defence from late July to 6 November 1979 and as a supervisor of the Islamic Revolutionary Guards. He also went to the battlefield as a representative of the defense commission of the parliament.

Assassination attempt 

Khamenei narrowly escaped an assassination attempt by the Mujahedin-e Khalq when a bomb, concealed in a tape recorder, exploded beside him.

On 27 June 1981, while Khamenei had returned from the frontline, he went to the Aboozar Mosque according to his Saturdays schedule. After the first prayer, he began to give a lecture to worshipers who had written their questions on a piece of paper. Meanwhile, a tape recorder accompanied with papers was put on the desk in front of Khamenei by a young man who pressed a button. After a minute the recorder began making a whistling sound, then suddenly exploded. "A gift of Furqan Group to the Islamic Republic" was written on the inner wall of the tape recorder. Ayatollah Khamenei's treatment took several months and his arm, vocal cords and lungs were seriously injured. He was permanently injured, losing the use of his right arm.

As president 

In 1981, after the assassination of Mohammad-Ali Rajai, Khamenei was elected President of Iran by a landslide vote (97%) in the October 1981 Iranian presidential election in which only four candidates were approved by the Council of Guardians. Khamenei became the first cleric to serve in the office. Ruhollah Khomeini had originally wanted to keep clerics out of the presidency but later changed his views. Khamenei was reelected in 1985 Iranian presidential election where only three candidates were approved by the Council of Guardians, receiving 87% of the votes. The only Iranian presidential election that had fewer candidates approved by the Council of Guardians was the 1989 Iranian presidential election, where only two candidates were approved by the Council of Guardians to run, and Rafsanjani easily won 96% of the votes.

In his presidential inaugural address Khamenei vowed to eliminate "deviation, liberalism, and American-influenced leftists". According to the Iran Chamber, vigorous opposition to the government, including nonviolent and violent protest, assassinations, guerrilla activity and insurrections, was answered by state repression and terror in the early 1980s, both before and during Khamenei's presidency. Thousands of rank-and-file members of insurgent groups were killed, often by revolutionary courts. By 1982, the government announced that the courts would be reined in, although various political groups continued to be repressed by the government in the first half of the 1980s.

During Iran–Iraq war 

Khamenei was one of Iran's leaders during the Iran–Iraq War in the 1980s, and developed close ties with the now-powerful Revolutionary Guards. As president, he had a reputation of being deeply interested in the military, budget and administrative details.

After the war 
In its 10 April 1997 ruling regarding the Mykonos restaurant assassinations, the German court issued an international arrest warrant for Iranian intelligence minister Ali Fallahian after declaring that the assassination had been ordered by him with knowledge of Khamenei and Rafsanjani. Iranian officials, however, have categorically denied their involvement. The then Iranian Parliament speaker Ali Akbar Nategh-Nouri dismissed the ruling as being political, untrue and unsubstantiated. The ruling led to a diplomatic crisis between the governments of Iran and several European countries, which lasted until November 1997. The accused assassins, Darabi and Rhayel, were finally released from prison on 10 December 2007 and deported back to their home countries.

Supreme Leader 

Khamenei has fired and reinstated Presidential cabinet appointments. Iran's Chief Justice Sadeq Larijani, a Khamenei appointee, has warned the president of Iran against voicing opposition to Khamenei.

Election as Supreme Leader 

In 1989 Ayatollah Khomeini dismissed Ayatollah Montazeri as his political successor, giving the position to Khamenei instead. Because Khamenei was neither a marja or ayatollah, the Assembly of Experts had to modify the constitution in order to award him the position of Iran's new Supreme Leader (a decision opposed by several grand ayatollahs).

Khamenei officially succeeded Ruhollah Khomeini after Khomeini's death, being elected as the new Supreme Leader by the Assembly of Experts on 4 June 1989.

Leadership council proposal 

Initially, the idea of leadership council was proposed by some members of Assembly of Experts. Various lists were proposed and Khamenei was named in all of them. For instance, a council of three members, Ali Meshkini, Mousavi Ardebili and Khamenei, was proposed to lead Iran. According to Rafsanjani, he and Khamenei were against the proposal while Ayatollah Haeri Shirazi and Ayatollah Ebrahim Amini were in favor of it. Supporters of the council proposal believed that having a council would produce a higher degree of unity in society and more positive characteristics would be found in a council, while the opposers believed that an individual leader was more efficient according to the past experiences in case of Judiciary council.

Ebrahim Amini listed the summary of reasons presented by the two sides. According to him the opposers rejected the proposal because: i) Evidences for Guardianship of the Islamic Jurist were true only for the guardianship of an individual and it was not clear who held the guardianship when there was a council. Guardianship of a council was not rooted in Hadiths and Islamic jurisprudence. ii) Previous council type organizations such as broadcasting council and supreme judicial council were not successful in practice and leadership council would not do well for similar reasons. iii) People were accustomed to the leadership of an individual and a council of leaders was something unfamiliar to them. iv) An individual leader could act more decisive when dealing with critical and important decisions and solving problems and crisis. On the other hand, the supporters of the proposal believed that: i) At the time, there were no Faqih equal to Khomeini or even two or three levels lower than him so that he could fulfill the expectation of people. ii) In case of council of leaders, the members could compensate each other, if any of them had some shortage in a field.

Finally, 45 members voted against the leadership council proposal while more than 20 people were in favor of it and the proposal was rejected. After the assembly rejected the idea of a Leadership Council, Khamenei was elected Leader by 60 of the 74 members present with Grand Ayatollah Mohammad-Reza Golpaygani receiving the remaining 14 votes. Khamenei made protestations of his unworthiness -- "my nomination should make us all cry tears of blood" and debated with the mujtahids of the Assembly—but eventually accepted the post.

Marjaʿiyyat criteria 

Since Khamenei was not a marja' at the time—which the Iranian constitution required—he was named as the temporary Supreme Leader. Later, the constitution was amended to remove that requirement and the Assembly of Experts reconvened on 6 August 1989, to reconfirm Khamenei with 60 votes out of 64 present. On 29 April 1989, responding to the letter of Ayatollah Meshkini, the head of committee responsible for revising the Constitution, asking Khomeini's viewpoint regarding the 'marjaʿiyyat criteria, Khomeini said: "From the very beginning, I believed and insisted that there is no need for the requirements of marjaʿiyyat (authority in jurisprudence). A pious mujtahid (jurist-intellectual), who is approved by the esteemed Assembly of Experts (Majlis-i Khobregan), will suffice." In a video that surfaced during the 2017–18 Iranian protests, Khamenei is seen before the assembly saying he was not religiously qualified to be Supreme leader. Khamenei, who was ranked as a Hujjat al-Islam and not a Marja' as required by the Iranian constitution, said he would only be a "ceremonial leader", and was reassured by Akbar Hashemi Rafsanjani the position would be "temporary" until a referendum, apparently planned for one year later.

On August 29, 2022, al-Haeri announced his resignation from the position of Marja, due to old age and illness. This was described as the first time in history a Marja has ever resigned from his position. He called on his followers to follow Ali Khamenei, Supreme Leader of Iran as "the best person for the leadership of our people and removing the aggressors".

Political strategy and philosophy 

Khamenei's era has differed from that of his predecessor. He has, however, continued Khomeini's policy of "balancing one group against another, making sure that no single side gains too much power." But lacking Khomeini's charisma and clerical standing, he has developed personal networks, first inside the armed forces, and then among the clerics, while administering the major bonyads and seminaries of Qom and Mashhad. Having been Supreme Leader for three decades, Khamenei has been able to place many loyalists throughout Iran's major institutions, "building a system that serves and protects him".  Former cleric Mehdi Khalaji and Saeid Golkar, describe Khamenei's system as having creating a "parallel structure" for each of the country's institutions (army, intelligence agencies, etc.) to keep those institutions weak.

According to Vali Nasr of the Johns Hopkins School of Advanced International Studies, "[Khamenei] [took] many of the powers of the presidency with him and [turned] the office of the supreme leader into the omnipotent overseer of Iran's political scene". In Nasr's view, Khamenei is an "unusual sort of dictator". Officials under Khamenei influence the country's various powerful, and sometimes bickering, institutions, including "the parliament, the presidency, the judiciary, the Revolutionary Guards, the military, the intelligence services, the police agencies, the clerical elite, the Friday prayer leaders and much of the media", as well as various "nongovernmental foundations, organizations, councils, seminaries and business groups".

Khamenei issues decrees and makes the final decisions on economy, environment, foreign policy and everything else in Iran. Khamenei regularly meets with president, cabinet members, head and officials of the judiciary branch, parliamentarians, among others, and tells them what to do. Khamenei has also fired and reinstated Presidential cabinet appointments. Khamenei meets with foreign dignitaries, however he does not travel overseas; if anyone wishes to see him, that person must travel to Iran. Apart from his time in Najaf as a student, Khamenei travelled to Libya during his time as president.

In his speeches Khamenei regularly mentions many familiar themes of the 1979 revolution: justice, independence, self-sufficiency, Islamic government and resolute opposition to Israel and United States, while rarely mentioning other revolutionary ideals such as democracy and greater government transparency. According to Karim Sadjadpour of the Carnegie Endowment for International Peace, Khamenei has "resisted Rafsanjani's attempts to find a modus vivendi with the United States, Khatami's aspirations for a more democratic Islamic state, and Ahmadinejad's penchant for outright confrontation."

Privatization of state-owned businesses 
In 2007, Khamenei called for the privatization of state-owned companies, including the telephone company, three banks and dozens of small oil and petrochemical enterprises. After a few months, at a televised meeting with then-President Mahmoud Ahmadinejad and his Cabinet ministers, important clerics, the leader of parliament and provincial governors, the heads of state broadcasting and the Iranian chamber of commerce, Khamenei ordered "to pass some laws, sell off some businesses, and be quick about it." Khamenei warned that "those who are hostile to these policies are the ones who are going to lose their interests and influence."

Dispute regarding status as Grand Ayatollah 

In 1994, after the death of Grand Ayatollah Mohammad Ali Araki, the Society of Seminary Teachers of Qom declared Khamenei a new marja. Several ayatollahs, however, declined to recognize him as such. Some of those dissidents clerics included Mohammad Shirazi, Hossein-Ali Montazeri, Hassan Tabatabai-Qomi, and Yasubedin Rastegar Jooybari. In 1997, for example, Montazeri "questioned the powers of the Leader" and was subsequently punished for his comments with the closure of his religious school, an attack on his office in Qom, and a period of house arrest.

Appointments 

The table below lists some of the incumbent senior officeholders in Iran directly appointed by the supreme leader (sorted by date of appointment):

Political power following reform era 
Khamenei developed a cult of personality; with supporters describing him as a "divine gift to mankind" and in which Khamenei critics are persecuted.

According to Karim Sadjadpour of the American Carnegie Endowment for International Peace, several factors have strengthened Khamenei in recent years:

According to Christopher Dickey, in order to consolidate his power base, Khamenei has developed close relations with the security and military establishment, while also expanding the bureaucracy inside the government and around his Beit Rahbari compound.

Financial assets 

Writing in The Daily Telegraph, Damien McElroy and Ahmad Vahdat observed: "The ayatollah likes to cultivate an image of austerity but receives major commissions from the Iranian oil and arms industries and there have been regular claims that he and his son have amassed a fortune running into billions of dollars." A six-month investigation by Reuters has said that Khamenei controls a "financial empire" worth approximately US$95 billion that is not overseen by the Iranian Parliament, a figure much larger than the estimated wealth of the late Shah of Iran. According to the Reuters investigation, Khamenei uses the assets of a company called Headquarters for Executing the Order of the Imam or "Setad" in Farsi, in order to increase his grip on power. Reuters "found no evidence that Khamenei is tapping Setad to enrich himself," but did find that he used Setad's funds, which "rival the holdings of the shah", for political expedience – "Setad gives him the financial means to operate independently of parliament and the national budget, insulating him from Iran's messy factional infighting." According to The Daily Telegraph, money from Setad is used to fund Khamenei's Beit Rahbari compound, which employs over 500 stewards, as was reported in 2013. Hamid Vaezi, Setad's head of public relations, said the information "was far from realities and is not correct". The six-month investigation by Reuters into found that, regarding the source of Setad's funds, "Setad built its empire on the systematic seizure of thousands of properties belonging to ordinary Iranians: members of religious minorities like Vahdat-e-Hagh, who is Baha'i, as well as Shi'ite Muslims, business people and Iranians living abroad."

Despite the negative accounts of Western sources, Iranian official sources depict Setad as a vast charity foundation. In an interview in October 2014 with Islamic Republic News Agency, Muhammad Mukhber, the head of Setad, stated that over 90% of profits from Setad business activities are spent on improving infrastructure in the poor regions of the country, creating jobs and improving the well-being of people in these regions reflecting the top concerns of Iran's Supreme Leader, Khamenei for the Iranian society. He state that 85 percent of Setad's charitable works take place in poor regions of Iran. He cited construction of several hundred schools, mosques and hussainiyas, as well as direct and indirect contribution to formation of over 350 thousands jobs expecting a total of 700 thousands for the upcoming three years. Mukhber also cited a sum total grant of 2.21 trillion rials of Qard al-Hasan, interest-free loans, to 41 thousands families in poor regions of the country. He also revealed plans of gradual sell-off of Setad profitable businesses in the stock market with the aim of transferring their ownership into the hands of Iranian people. He also envisioned construction and delivery of 17 thousands housing units to families in poor regions of Iran by 2018.

Challenges following 2009 election protest 

In mid-August 2009, a group of unnamed former reformist lawmakers appealed to the Assembly of Experts – the constitutional body charged with electing and (in theory) supervising and removing the Leader – to investigate Leader Ali Khamenei's qualification to rule. A week later another anonymous letter was issued "calling Iran's leader a dictator and demanding his removal", this one by a group of Iranian clerics. The letters were called a blow to Khamenei's "status as a neutral arbiter and Islamic figurehead" and an "unprecedented challenge to the country's most powerful man" though not a blow to his actual power as leader. The New York Times reports "the phrase 'death to Khamenei' has begun appearing in graffiti on Tehran walls, a phrase that would have been almost unimaginable not long ago."

The letter was addressed to the head of the Assembly of Experts, Ayatollah Akbar Hashemi Rafsanjani, a "powerful former president" who also questions the election results. According to the Associated Press it is unlikely the letter's demands would be met as "two-thirds of the 86-member assembly are considered strong loyalists of Khamenei and would oppose" any investigation of him.

According to The New York Times reporting in mid-August 2009, a "prominent Iranian cleric and a former lawmaker said on Sunday that they had spoken to some of the authors and had no doubt the letter was genuine". According to this cleric, the letter's signatories number "several dozen, and are mostly midranking figures from Qum, Isfahan and Mashhad", and that "the pressure on clerics in Qum is much worse than the pressure on activists because the establishment is afraid that if they say anything they can turn the more traditional sectors of society against the regime".

Relations with former President Ahmadinejad 

Early in his presidency, Ahmadinejad was sometimes described as "enjoy[ing] the full backing" of the Supreme Leader , and even as being his "protege." In Ahmadinejad's 2005 inauguration the supreme leader allowed Ahmadinejad to kiss his hand and cheeks in what was called "a sign of closeness and loyalty," and after the 2009 election fully endorsed Ahmadinejad against protesters. However, as early as January 2008 signs of disagreement between the two men developed over domestic policies, and by the period of 2010–11 several sources detected a "growing rift" between them. The disagreement was described as centered on Esfandiar Rahim Mashaei, a top adviser and close confidant of Ahmadinejad and opponent of "greater involvement of clerics in politics", who was first vice president of Iran until being ordered to resign from the cabinet by the supreme leader.

In 2009, Ahmadinejad dismissed Intelligence Minister Gholam-Hossein Mohseni-Eje'i, an opponent of Mashaei. In April 2011, another Intelligence minister, Heydar Moslehi, resigned after being asked to by Ahmadinejad, but was reinstated by the supreme leader within hours. Ahmadinejad declined to officially back Moslehi's reinstatement for two weeks and in protest engaged in an "11-day walkout" of cabinet meetings, religious ceremonies, and other official functions. Ahmadinejad's actions led to angry public attacks by clerics, parliamentarians and military commanders, who accused him of ignoring orders from the supreme leader. Conservative opponents in parliament launched an "impeachment drive" against him, four websites with ties to Ahmadinejad reportedly were "filtered and blocked", and several people "said to be close" to the president and Mashaei (such as Abbas Amirifar and Mohammed Sharif Malekzadeh) were arrested on charges of being "magicians" and invoking djinns. On 6 May 2011, it was reported that Ahmadinejad had been given an ultimatum to accept the leader's intervention or resign, and on 8 May he "apparently bowed" to the reinstatement, welcoming back Moslehi to a cabinet meeting. The events have been said to have "humiliated and weakened" Ahmadinejad, though the president denied that there had been any rift between the two, and according to the semiofficial Fars News Agency, he stated that his relationship with the supreme leader "is that of a father and a son."

In 2012, Khamenei ordered a halt to a parliamentary inquiry into Ahmadinejad's mishandling of the Iranian economy. In 2016, Khamenei advised Mahmoud Ahmadinejad, his former ally with whom his relationship was strained after Ahmadinejad accused his son Mojtaba Khamenei of embezzling from the state treasury, to not run for president again.

Fatwas and messages

Fatwa against nuclear weapons 

Khamenei has reportedly issued a fatwa saying the production, stockpiling, and use of nuclear weapons was forbidden under Islam.

The fatwa was cited in an official statement by the Iranian government at an August 2005 meeting of the International Atomic Energy Agency (IAEA) in Vienna. It's been widely discussed by international officials and specifically recognized by the US administration.

The Iranian official website for information regarding its nuclear program has provided numerous instances of public statements by Khamenei wherein he voices his opposition to pursuit and development of nuclear weapons in moral, religious and Islamic juridical terms. Khamenei's official website specifically cites a 2010 version of these statements in the fatwa section of the website in Farsi as a fatwa on "Prohibition of Weapons of Mass Destruction".

Doubts have been cast by experts on the existence of the fatwa as it can be changed or modified as and when deemed necessary, as well as doubts on its authenticity, its impact, and its apparently religious nature. Gareth Porter believes that the fatwa is "sincere" and Gholam-Hossein Elham commented that it will not change.

Fatwa on Islamic legal interpretation

In 2000, Ali Khamenei sent a letter to the Iranian parliament forbidding the legislature from debating a revision of the Iranian press law to allow more freedom of the press. He wrote: "The present press law has succeeded to a point in preventing this big plague. The draft bill is not legitimate and in the interests of the system and the revolution."

In 1996, he issued a fatwa stating  "The promotion of music [both traditional and Western] in schools is contrary to the goals and teachings of Islam, regardless of age and level of study."
(Many music schools were closed and public (but not private) music instruction to children under the age of 16 was banned thereafter.) Khamenei stated,
In 1999, Khamenei issued a fatwa stating that it was permitted to use a third-party (donor sperm, ova or surrogacy) in fertility treatments. This was different in "both style and substance" to the fatwa on Assisted Reproductive Technology (ART) by Gad El-Hak Ali Gad El-Hak of Egypt's Al-Azhar University in the late 1980s which permitted ART (IVF and similar technologies) as long there is no third-party donation (of sperm, eggs, embryos, or uteruses).

In 2002, he ruled that human stem cell research was permissible under Islam, with the condition that it be used to create only parts as opposed to a whole human.

In 2002, after protests erupted in the capital, Khamenei intervened against the death sentence given to Hashem Aghajari for arguing that Muslims should re-interpret Islam rather than blindly follow leaders. Khamenei ordered a review of the sentence against Aghajari and it was later commuted to a prison sentence.

Other messages
Sayyid Ali Khamenei annually issues message(s) on the occasion of Hajj for all Muslims (pilgrims) in Hajj. He commenced to issue such messages since the start of his responsibility as the supreme leader of Iran (1989). He continually invites all Muslims to Tawhid, and afterwards expresses concerning the significance of Hajj in spiritual/social life. He also asks the Muslims to be aware of what he considers "the conspiracy of the enemies" by having a right comprehension, and advises them to "not be deceived by them". So far, Iran's supreme leader has issued 32 messages (since 1989). A part of his last message (6 August 2019) is as follows:

Khamenei was one of the Ulama signatories of the Amman Message, which gives a broad foundation for defining Muslim orthodoxy. as well as elaborating on the factors needed to create Islamic unity, he argues: "neither the Shia Muslims allied with the British MI6 are Shias, nor the Sunni mercenaries of the American CIA are Sunnis, as they are both anti-Islamic."

Other fatwas

In 2010, Khamenei issued a fatwa which bans any insult to the Sahabah (companions of Muhammad) as well as Muhammad's wives. The fatwa was issued in an effort to reconcile legal, social, and political disagreements between Sunni and Shia. In 2017, he issued a fatwa against women riding bicycles in public.

Domestic policy 

Khamenei is regarded by some as the figurehead of the country's conservative establishment.

Khamenei supported Mesbah Yazdi describing him as one of Iran's most credible ideologues prior to the 2005 election, but has reportedly "recently been concerned about Mesbah's political ambitions."

In 2007, Khamenei requested that government officials speed up Iran's move towards economic privatization. Its last move towards such a goal was in 2004, when Article 44 of the constitution was overturned. Article 44 had decreed that Iran's core infrastructure should remain state-run. Khamenei also suggested that ownership rights should be protected in courts set up by the Justice Ministry; the hope was that this new protection would give a measure of security to and encourage private investment. In 2007, Iranian police under the direction of Khamenei launched a "Public Security Plan", arresting dozens of "thugs" to increase public security.

Additionally, Khamenei has stated that he believes in the importance of nuclear technology for civilian purposes because "oil and gas reserves cannot last forever."

On 30 April 2008, Ali Khamenei backed President Ahmadinejad's economic policy and said the West was struggling with more economic difficulties than Iran, with a "crisis" spreading from the United States to Europe, and inflation was a widespread problem. The Iranian leader said that the ongoing economic crisis which has debilitated the world has been unprecedented in the past 60 years. "This crisis has forced the UN to declare state of emergency for food shortages around the globe but foreign radios have focused on Iran to imply that the current price hikes and inflation in the country are the results of carelessness on the part of Iranian officials which of course is not true", he said. Khamenei emphasized that no one has the right to blame the Iranian government for Iran's economic problems. He also advised people and the government to be content and avoid waste in order to solve economic problems. "I advise you to keep in your mind that this great nation is never afraid of economic sanctions", he added.

Presidential, parliamentary, and Assembly of Experts elections 

As Supreme Leader, Khamenei has influence over elections in Iran since the Constitution of Iran allows him to appoint half of the members of the Guardian Council and the Chief Justice of Iran. The Constitution also establishes that the Council approves or disqualifies candidates for office while the Chief Justice presents the other half of the members of the council to be selected by Parliament. These constitutional provisions give Khamenei direct and indirect influence over the council; an entity that, in turn, has direct influence over who can run for government. This influence was evident in the 2004 parliamentary elections, in which the Guardian Council disqualified thousands of candidates from running—including 80 incumbents, many of the reformist members of Parliament, and all the candidates of the Islamic Iran Participation Front party. Subsequently, the conservatives won about 70 percent of parliamentary seats. The election became a key turning point in the country's political evolution as it marked the end of the campaign for political and social reform initiated by former President Mohammad Khatami.

During the 2005 presidential election, Khamenei's comments about importance of fighting corruption, being faithful to the ideals of the Islamic revolution, as well as on the superior intelligence and dynamism of those who studied engineering, were interpreted by some as a subtle endorsement of Mahmoud Ahmadinejad (who had a PhD in traffic engineering). After the election, and until recently, Khamenei was outspoken in his support for Ahmadinejad, and "defended him publicly in ways which he never" had reformist president Khatami. Khamenei would later certify the results of the 2009 Iranian Presidential election.

Khamenei took a firm stand against the 2009–10 Iranian election protests, and stated that he will neither reconsider vote results nor bow to public pressure over the disputed reelection of President Mahmoud Ahmadinejad. "By Allah's favor, the presidential election was accurately held, and the current matters should be pursued legally." In a public appearance on 19 June he expresses his support for the declared winner Ahmadinejad and accused foreign powers—including Britain, Israel and the United States—of helping foment protest against the election results. In particular, he singled out Britain, perceiving the country as the "most evil" of its enemies. He said that the Iranian people will respond with an "iron fist" if Western powers meddle in Iran's internal affairs.

In response to reformist gains in the 2015–2016 election cycle, Khamenei lamented the loss of conservative clerics from the Assembly of Experts and suggested changes to the law by which the Guardian Council vets candidates may be needed because it is currently too difficult for the Guardian Council to vet so large a number of candidates.

Science and technology 

Ali Khamenei has been supportive of scientific progress in Iran. He was among the first Islamic clerics to allow stem cell research and therapeutic cloning. In 2004, Khamenei said that the country's progress is dependent on investment in the field of science and technology. He also said that attaching a high status to scholars and scientists in society would help talents to flourish and science and technology to become domesticated, thus ensuring the country's progress and development.

Foreign policy 

Khamenei has "direct responsibility" for foreign policy, which "cannot be conducted without his direct involvement and approval". He has a foreign policy team independent of the president's "which includes two former foreign ministers" and "can at any time of his choosing inject himself into the process and 'correct' a flawed policy or decision." His foreign policy is said to steer a course that avoids either confrontation or accommodation with the West.

Khamenei condemned the Saudi Arabian-led intervention in Yemen and compared Saudi Arabia to Israel.

Khamenei condemned the persecution of Rohingya Muslims in Myanmar and called Myanmar's de facto leader and Nobel Peace Prize laureate Aung Sang Suu Kyi a "brutal woman".

U.S. Secretary of State Mike Pompeo criticized Khamenei for his refusal to condemn the Xinjiang re-education camps and human rights abuses against the Uyghur Muslim minority in China.

Beliefs about the United States and its foreign policy 
The United States and Iran have had no formal diplomatic relations since the Iran hostage crisis of 1980 when US embassy was taken over and US diplomats were taken prisoner.  According to study by Karim Sadjadpour, speeches by Khamenei regularly mention the principle of resolute opposition to the United States; and according to Karim Sadjadpour he has "resisted Rafsanjani's attempts to find a modus vivendi with the United States", and once told reformist president Mohammad Khatami that "we need the United States as an enemy".

On 4 June 2006, Khamenei said that Iran would disrupt energy shipments from the Persian Gulf region (about 20% of the world's daily supply of oil passes from the Persian Gulf through the Strait of Hormuz very close to Iran's coast) should the country come under attack from the US, insisting that Tehran will not give up its right to produce nuclear fuel.

On 14 September 2007, Ayatollah Ali Khamenei (on the 1st Friday prayer of Ramadan) predicted that George W. Bush and American officials will one day be tried in an international criminal court to be held "accountable" for the U.S. led invasion of Iraq. He asserts that the United States is the main cause of insecurity in Iraq.

On 21 March 2009, a day after US President Barack Obama advocated a "new beginning" in diplomatic relations between the two countries, Khamenei said a change of US "words" was not enough and added: "We will watch and we will judge (the new US administration) ... You change, our behavior will change." He rejected US foreign policy since the Islamic revolution, insisted the United States is "hated in the world" and should end its interference in other countries.

Khamenei criticized the NATO-led military intervention in Libya. On 21 March 2011, Khamenei accused the West of having "come after Libyan oil". He also stressed that "Iran utterly condemns the behaviour of the Libyan government against its people, the killings and pressure on people, and the bombing of its cities... but it (also) condemns the military action in Libya". Khamenei stated that he support sending mediators rather than bombing the country.

In June 2011, Khamenei accused the United States government of terrorism and rejected the American definition of terrorism; he was quoted as saying, "The U.S. and the European governments that follow it describe Palestinian combatant groups who fight for the liberation of their land as terrorists."

In June 2012, Khamenei warned Western governments that the mounting sanctions on the country will only deepen the Iranians' hatred of the West.

In October 2014, Khamenei said the U.S. and the U.K. created ISIS as a tool to fight Iran and "create insecurity" in the region.

On 19 July 2015, while speaking at a mosque in Tehran, Khamenei said to his supporters that the policies of the United States in the region were "180 degrees" opposed to Iran's political and religious movement. The speech was punctuated by chants of "Death to America" and "Death to Israel". Khamenei said in regards to the 2015 nuclear deal that "Even after this deal, our policy towards the arrogant U.S. will not change." U.S. Secretary of State John Kerry said that if the comments reflected policy, it was "very disturbing", and "very troubling".

In March 2020, Khamenei warned against a United States offer of aid to fight COVID-19 on the grounds that it could be a way to hurt Iran by further spreading the disease. He also suggested the US had developed a special variety of the virus "based on Iranian genetic information they have gathered", although he provided no evidence for the theory. Khamenei explained, "There are enemies who are demons, and there are enemies who are humans, and they help one another."

In March 2022, Khamenei accused the U.S. of creating the conflict surrounding the Russo-Ukrainian War.

Condemnation of September 11 attacks 
After the September 11 attacks, Khamenei condemned the act and the attackers and called for a condemnation of terrorist activities all over the world, but warned strongly against a military intervention in Afghanistan. He is quoted as saying, "Mass killings of human beings are catastrophic acts which are condemned wherever they may happen and whoever the perpetrators and the victims may be."

Zionism and Israel 

Khamenei is an opponent of the State of Israel and Zionism, and has been criticized for making threats against Israel and for anti-Semitic rhetoric.

On 15 December 2000, Khamenei called Israel a "cancerous tumor of a state" that "should be removed from the region" and in 2013 called Israel a "rabid dog", as well as in 2014 during the Gaza war, for what he called attacking innocent people. In 2014, a tweet from an account attributed to Khamenei, claimed that there was no cure for Israel but its annihilation.

In a September 2008 sermon for Friday prayers in Tehran, Khamenei stated that "it is incorrect, irrational, pointless and nonsense to say that we are friends of Israeli people", because he believed that the occupation is done by the means of them. "[U]surpation of houses, lands, and business [of Palestinian people] are carried out using these people. They are the background actors of Zionist elements," said Khamenei in his speech. "[W]e have no problem with Jews and Christians ... we have problem with the usurpers of Palestine land," he added. Also, he said that he had raised the issue "to spell an end to any debates". In 2013, Khamenei accused France of "kneeling" before Israel, while saying that Israel was led by people unworthy of the "title human".

Nevertheless, according to anti-regime change activist Abbas Edalat, in 2005 Khamenei responded to a remark by then-President Ahmadinejad which had been widely translated as saying that the "regime occupying Jerusalem should be wiped off the map" by saying that "the Islamic Republic has never threatened and will never threaten any country."

In a September 2009 sermon, Khamenei was quoted as saying, that "the Zionist cancer is gnawing into the lives of Islamic nations." In another report of the same speech, he added that "we will support and help any nations, any groups fighting against the Zionist regime across the world, and we are not afraid of declaring this."

Khamenei instead proposed that "Palestinian refugees should return and Muslims, Christians and Jews could choose a government for themselves, excluding immigrant Jews," adding "No one will allow a bunch of thugs, lechers and outcasts from London, America and Moscow to rule over the Palestinians."

On 10 September 2015, in a speech about Israel after agreement on the nuclear program of Iran, Khamenei made a remark "Israel will not exist in 25 years". For the first time, the remark was published in Khamenei's official website and his Twitter. This statement was reported as voted as the best and most important among Khamenei's statements in 2015 by an online poll conducted by his official website.

On 21 February, at the 6th International Conference in Support of the Palestinian Intifada, Khamenei regarded withdrawal of Israel from south Lebanon in 2000 and from Gaza in 2005 as two major achievements so far. Also, he advised the Islamic countries to refrain from "useless" crises and differences and instead concentrate on the issue of Palestine which he regarded as the core issue of Islam. "Otherwise, the potentials and capabilities of the nations will go to waste in the face of vain struggles, which would provide opportunities for the Zionist regime to become even stronger," he added.

Khamenei condemned the peace agreement between Israel and the United Arab Emirates and charged UAE with betraying the Islamic world, the Arab countries and Palestine. He stated that the normalization will be only temporary, but the UAE will forever have to bear the shame regarding the deal.

Holocaust denial 
On 21 March 2014, during a morning speech marking the Persian New Year, Nowruz, Khamenei called into question the Holocaust. He said that "the Holocaust is an event whose reality is uncertain and if it has happened, it's uncertain how it has happened". Additionally he commented that "No one in European countries dares to speak about [the] Holocaust" (because of the potential legal consequences in some countries), and said that in the West, "speaking about [the] Holocaust and expressing doubts about it is considered to be a great sin." The Anti-Defamation League accused Khamenei in March 2014 of making statements of explicit Holocaust denial.

On Holocaust Memorial Day, 27 January 2016, Khamenei posted a Holocaust denying video on his official website. In the video (drawing on the March 2014 speech), lasting about three minutes, the video features images of Holocaust deniers Roger Garaudy, Robert Faurisson, and David Irving. In a series of tweets in mid-December 2019, he praised Garaudy: "The fight he engaged in against the Zionists is a #DivineDuty for all those who respect the #Truth." France's conviction of Garaudy, he said, was against the concept of freedom of speech.

Anti-semitism
At least one source (Yair Rosenberg), argues that statements by Khamenei purporting to attack "Zionism", are following an anti-Semitic tradition of avoiding censorship by using "Zionism" as a dog whistle for "Jews". For example, an 8 June 2022 statement tweeted by Khamenei:
"The Zionists have always been a plague, even before establishing the fraudulent Zionist regime. Even then, Zionist capitalists were a plague for the whole world." 
makes more sense (though is just as  slanderous), if "Zionists" is replaced by "Jews". (The Zionist movement not have being founded until the late 19th century, Zionists are not likely to "have always been a plague".) Other accusations of Anti-Semitism  have come from Victoria Coates and Ellie Cohanim, who note his holocaust denial, and find his "nine-point plan" to "wipe" Israel "off the face of the earth" uncomfortably reminiscent of Hitler's Final Solution; and the  Jerusalem Post, who  quote Khamenei's attack on the 2020 Israel–United Arab Emirates normalization agreement: 
and argue "filthy Zionist agents," "the Jewish member of Trump's family" (i.e. Jared Kushner), and "cruel", are all words channeling "antisemitic tropes and dog whistles".

Human rights, freedoms, protests, Islamic law 

Critics have accused Khamenei of overseeing the assassination of as many as 160 exiled defectors worldwide, the heavy handed repression of protesters, the killings of tens of thousands of members of the M.E.K. (People's Mujahedin of Iran) paramilitary group, and of making dissident writers and intellectuals in Iran "a special target" of repression, among other infractions of human rights.
However, Khamenei himself has insisted human rights are a fundamental principle underlying Islamic teachings, that precedes western concern for human rights by many centuries. He has attacked Western powers who have criticized the rights record of the Islamic Republic for hypocrisy saying that these countries economically oppress people in Third World countries and support despots and dictators. In response to Western complaints of human rights abuses in Iran he has stated that the American administration has committed many crimes and is therefore not fit to judge the Islamic Republic.

Protests during leadership 

There have been several major protests during Khamenei's reign, including the 1994 Qazvin Protests—where, according to Al-Arabiya, around 40 people were killed and over 400 were injured— the 1999 Iranian student protests, the 2009 Iranian presidential election protests, when protesters chanted "death to the dictator", and ripped down pictures of Khamenei, as well as the 2011–12 Iranian protests and 2017–18 Iranian protests, among others. In 2016, Khamenei, who outlines the elections guidelines "in line with Article 110 of Iran's Constitution", asked to maximize the amount of transparency in elections in Iran, using modern technologies.

During the Mahshahr massacre, protests expanded against "government corruption, failing institutions, lack of freedoms and the repressive rule of Iran's supreme leader, Ayatollah Ali Khamenei."

During the 2018–2019 Iranian general strikes and protests, Khameini demanded punishment for those "who disrupt economic security". According to Reuters, the remarks were "clearly intended to send a message to Iranians who may plan more demonstrations".

During the 2019–2020 Iranian protests, Khamenei met with various officials and cabinet members, saying "he would hold the assembled officials responsible for the consequences of the protests if they didn't immediately stop them." According to an official, Khamenei "made clear the demonstrations required a forceful response" and that "rioters should be crushed."

During the Ukraine International Airlines Flight 752 protests, thousands of protesters demanded Ayatollah Ali Khamenei's resignation.

Minorities 

The Baháʼí Faith is the largest religious minority in Iran, with around 300,000 members (8,000,000 members worldwide) and is officially considered a dangerous cult by Iranian government. It is banned in Iran and several other countries. Khamenei has approved new legislation against Baháʼís in Iran and lessen their influence abroad. According to a letter from the Chairman of the Command Headquarters of the Armed Forces in Iran addressed to the Ministry of Information, the Revolutionary Guard, and the Police Force, Khamenei has also ordered the Command Headquarters to identify people who adhere to the Baháʼí Faith and to monitor their activities and gather any and all information about the members of the Baháʼí Faith.

Relationship with the press 

In 2000, he was listed by the Committee to Protect Journalists as "one of the top ten enemies of the press and freedom of expression", and was named to the Time 100 in 2007. Opposition journalists Ahmad Zeidabadi, Mohsen Sazegara, Mohammad Nourizad and Akbar Ganji were arrested and investigated for spreading critical articles containing unproven charges against Khamenei's policies as the leader and some organizations. According to the Iran's Press Law "spreading rumors and lies and distorts the words of others" is not allowed. Also, according to the law, "spreading libel against officials, institutions, organizations and individuals in the country or insulting legal or real persons who are lawfully respected, even by means of pictures or caricatures" is not allowed.

In 2000, Ali Khamenei sent a letter to the Iranian parliament forbidding the legislature from debating a revision of the Iranian press law to allow more freedom. (The law had been used "to close more than 20 independent newspapers" from 1997 to 2000.) He wrote: "The present press law has succeeded to a point in preventing this big plague. The draft bill is not legitimate and in the interests of the system and the revolution." His was called a use of "extra-legislative power" by reformists and opposition groups. but Speaker of Parliament Mehdi  Karroubi reminded "deputies that the constitution contained 'elements of the absolute rule of the supreme clerical leader'".

Kayhan and Jomhuri-ye Eslami are two newspapers published under the management of Khamenei.

Among his controversial actions were his rejection of a bill presented by the Iranian parliament in 2000 that aimed to reform the country's press law, and the disqualification of thousands of parliamentary candidates for the 2004 Iranian legislative election by the Guardian Council he appointed.

In 2012, 2013, and 2014, Forbes selected Khamenei as the 21st, 23rd, and 19th most powerful person in the world, respectively, in the list of The World's Most Powerful People.

Trials of people for insulting Khamenei 
Several journalists, bloggers, and other individuals were put on trial in Iran for the charge of insulting the Supreme Leader, often in conjunction with blasphemy charges.

In 1996, Abbas Maroufi was sentenced to 35 lashes and 6 months imprisonment for spreading lies and insulting Khamenei. Maroufi was also banned from working as a journalist and his literary monthly Gardoon was closed. Maroufi had compared Khamenei to former Shah of Iran Mohammed Reza Pahlavi.

In 2005, an Iranian was jailed for two years for insulting Khamenei and Imam Khomeini while being cleared of insulting the prophet.

In 2009, Iranian blogger Omid Reza Mir Sayafi who was arrested for insulting Khamenei in an internet post, died while in custody in Evin Prison.

In 2010, opposition activist Ahmad Gabel was sentenced to 20 months in jail for insulting Khamenei, as well as 3 additional years for possessing a satellite receiver, a 3-year exile and a fine.

In 2014, eight men including a Briton were sentenced for 19 to 20 years for insulting Khamenei and other charges relating to Facebook comments.

In 2017, Sina Dehghan was sentenced to death for insulting the prophet, with an additional 16-month sentence for insulting Khamenei in a messaging application.

Gender issues

In July 2007, Khamenei criticized Iranian women's rights activists and the Convention on the Elimination of All Forms of Discrimination Against Women (CEDAW): "In our country ... some activist women, and some men, have been trying to play with Islamic rules in order to match international conventions related to women", Khamenei said. "This is wrong." Khamenei made these comments two days after Iranian women's rights activist Delaram Ali was sentenced to 34 months of jail and 10 lashes by Iran's judiciary.

Khamenei is an advocate of Islamic practice of Hijab. He believes that hijab is aimed at honoring women. To the Western objection to the compulsory hijab in Iran, he responds by pointing out the compulsory unveiling in certain western countries and obstacles created for veiled Muslim women who want to enter universities. He further argues that women in the West have lost their honor by pointing out perceived high rate of sexual violence in the West as well as the widespread exploitation of female sexual appeal for commercial purposes.

Ali Khamenei believes in gender segregation. Khamenei also believes that gender equality is a Zionist plot with the purpose to "corrupt the role of women in society".

On LGBT issues, Khamenei has said: "Today, homosexuality is a major problem in the western world. They [western nations] however ignore it. But the reality is that homosexuality has become a serious challenge, pain and unsolvable problem for the intellectuals in the west."

Personal life

Sanctions

On 24 June 2019, the United States imposed sanctions on Khamenei with the signing of Executive Order 13876.

Family
Khamenei is married to Mansoureh Khojasteh Bagherzadeh, with whom he has six children; four sons (Mostafa, Mojtaba, Masoud, and Meysam) and two daughters (Boshra and Hoda). One of his sons, Mojtaba, married a daughter of Gholam-Ali Haddad-Adel. His eldest son, Mostafa, is married to a daughter of Azizollah Khoshvaght. Another son, Masoud, is married to the daughter of Mohsen Kharazi. He has three brothers, including Mohammad Khamenei and Hadi Khamenei. One of his four sisters, Badri Hosseini Khamenei (wife of dissident Ali Tehrani), fled into exile in the 1980s.

Home
As Supreme Leader, Khamenei moved to a house in Central Tehran on Palestine Street. A compound grew around it that now contains around fifty buildings. Around 500 people are employed at this "Beit Rahbari compound" according to The Telegraph, "many recruited from the military and security services".

Lifestyle
According to Mehdi Khalaji, an Iran expert at the Washington Institute for Near East Policy, Khamenei has a decent life "without it being luxurious". Robert Tait of The Daily Telegraph commented that Khamenei is "renowned for a spartan lifestyle."  Dexter Filkins describes Khamenei as presenting himself "as an ascetic, dressing and eating simply". In an interview with a women's magazine, his wife declared that "we do not have decorations, in the usual sense. Years ago, we freed ourselves from these things."
On the other hand, Mother Nature Network claims Khamenei has been seen riding around in a BMW car and published a picture of him exiting one. In a 2011 report in The Daily Telegraph, defectors from Iran claimed Khamenei has a considerable appetite of caviar and trout, a stable of 100 horses, collects items such as pipes and (reputedly) 170 antique walking sticks, and has a private court stretching over six palaces. Intelligence sources have also said his family has extensive international business interests.

Health 
Khamenei's health has been called into question. In January 2007, after he had not been seen in public for some weeks, and had not appeared as he traditionally does at celebrations for Eid al-Adha, rumours spread of his illness or death. Khamenei issued a statement declaring that "enemies of the Islamic system fabricated various rumors about death and health to demoralize the Iranian nation", but according to author Hooman Majd, he appeared to be "visibly weak" in photos released with the statement.

On 9 September 2014, Khamenei underwent prostate surgery in what his doctors described in state news media as a "routine operation". According to a report by Le Figaro, Western intelligence sources said Khamenei has prostate cancer.

In September 2022, it was reported that Khamenei had undergone surgery for bowel obstruction and had to cancel a number of meetings.

Literature and art 
In late 1996, following a fatwa by Khamenei stating that music education corrupts the minds of young children and is against Islam, many music schools were closed and music instruction to children under the age of 16 was banned by public establishments (although private instruction continued).

Khamenei has stated that "poetry must be the vanguard of the caravan of the [Islamic] revolution... [T]hrough the arts and literature, the revolution can be exported in an easier and more honest way." It has been suggested (by Dexter Filkins) that this might explain his interest in banning books, prohibiting newspapers and imprisoning artists.
He has expressed interest in the study of the novels and stories since childhood and studied various world's credible novels. He was "fascinated by Jean-Paul Sartre and Bertrand Russell" in his youth. He praised the works of Mikhail Sholokhov, Alexei Tolstoy, Honoré de Balzac, and Michel Zévaco. However, Victor Hugo's Les Misérables "is the best novel that has been written in history." He explained:

He suggested reading The Grapes of Wrath to "an audience of writers and artists" and Uncle Tom's Cabin to the high-level state managers as he thought it shed light on the history of United States.

Khamenei is fluent in Arabic in addition to his native languages, Persian and Azerbaijani. He has translated several books into Persian from Arabic, including the works of the Egyptian Islamic theoretician Sayyid Qutb.

When it comes to poetry, in Mashhad he used to participate in the literary associations along with known poets and used to critique poems. Writing some poems himself, he chose pseudonym 'Amin' for himself.

In the field of music, he is known to have a good singing voice and plays the tar, a traditional Iranian stringed instrument.

Public diplomacy 

In February 2011, Ali Khamenei supported the Egyptian uprising against their government, describing it as Islamic awakening instead of Arab Spring. Trying to communicate with Arab people, he addressed Egypt's protesters in Arabic. (Even though his native language is Persian.) He introduced himself as "your brother in religion", while praising the "explosion of sacred anger". Later, in "Islamic Awakening conferences" which were held in Tehran, Khamenei praised the Muslim youths of Tunisia, Libya, Egypt, Yemen and Bahrain for what he described as Islamic awakening. He also paralleled these events with Islamic revolution in Iran during his Nowruz oration in 2011. However, major protests against the Iranian regime also broke out throughout Iran in 2011, and they became known as the 2011–12 Iranian protests.

Works 

 Four main books of Rijal
 An Outline of Islamic Thought in the Quran
 Honest leader
 Discourse on Patience (translation by Sayyid Hussein Alamdar available online)
 Iqbal: Manifestation of the Islamic Spirit, Two Contemporary Muslim Views 
 Iqbal, the Poet-Philosopher of Islamic Resurgence is one of the "Two Contemporary Muslim Views", the other one is Ali Shariati's.
 Replies to Inquiries about the Practical Laws of Islam  (PDF version)
 Lessons from the Nahjul-Balaghah
 Human Rights in Islam
 The Charter of Freedom
 Essence of Tawhid: Denial of Servitude but to God
Translations from Arabic:
 Future in the realm of Islam

Collections:
 A 250 Years Old Person
 Palestine

See also 

 Khamenei family
 Motto of years in Islamic Republic of Iran
 Islamic Government (book by Khomeini)
Muhammad Kazim Khurasani
Mirza Husayn Tehrani
Abdallah Mazandarani
Mirza Ali Aqa Tabrizi
Mirza Sayyed Mohammad Tabatabai
Seyyed Abdollah Behbahani
Fazlullah Nouri
Hibatullah Akhundzada

Footnotes

References

External links 

Official
 
 The Office of the Supreme Leader of Iran
 Official English-language Twitter account
Photo
 Pictures in Iran-Iraq War, tarikhirani.ir
 Ali Khamenei gallery in Khamenei's website
Media
 
 
 
 
 
 
 
 
Videos
 Video Archive of Ayatollah Khamenei
 Ayatollah Khamenei in the city of Ardabil reading different poems in Azerbaijani language about Imam Hussein and events in Karbala.

|-

|-

|-

|-

|-

|-

 
1939 births
Living people
20th-century translators
Al-Husayni family
Anti-Americanism
Anti-Zionism in the Middle East
Central Council of the Islamic Republican Party members
Combatant Clergy Association politicians
Commanders-in-Chief of Iran
Council of the Islamic Revolution members
Deputies of Tehran, Rey, Shemiranat and Eslamshahr
Iranian Azerbaijanis
Iranian dissidents
Iranian grand ayatollahs
Iranian Holocaust deniers
Iranian individuals subject to the U.S. Department of the Treasury sanctions
Iranian Islamists
Iranian people of the Iran–Iraq War
Iranian politicians with disabilities
Iranian revolutionaries
Iranian translators
Islamic Republican Party secretaries-general
Members of the 1st Islamic Consultative Assembly
Members of the Assembly of Experts
People from Mashhad
People of the Iranian Revolution
Presidents of Iran
Specially Designated Nationals and Blocked Persons List
Supreme Leaders of Iran
Theocrats
Qom Seminary alumni